Hejaaz International School in Dehiwala-Mount Lavinia, Sri Lanka provides English Medium education (Cambridge/Local) to boys and girls in separate campuses in an Islamic environment. The school was started in 1994. At its inception, there were only 3 teachers and 17 students. The school was first started at a small house in Mt. Lavina, with classes in rooms and halls. The school is home to over 1000 students and over 100 teachers, with 3 branches today. The boys' school is in Mt. Lavinia and the girls' schools are in Dehiwala. Students not only from Sri Lanka, but also from the Middle East, Maldives and other Asian countries attend this school. The school has many extracurricular activities like karate, basketball, netball (girls), nand, Scrabble, model UN, debate, art, football (boys), cricket (boys), athletics (boys), qaseeda, and quiz.

1994 establishments in Sri Lanka
Educational institutions established in 1994
International schools in Sri Lanka
Schools in Mount Lavinia